Elizabeth Graver (born 1964) is an American writer and academic.

Early life and education
Graver was born in Los Angeles on July 2, 1964, and grew up in Williamstown, Massachusetts. She received her B.A. from Wesleyan University in 1986, and her M.F.A. from the Washington University in St. Louis in 1999. She also did graduate work at Cornell University.

Career 
A recipient of fellowships from Guggenheim Foundation, the MacDowell Colony, Yaddo, the National Endowment for the Arts, and the Suzy Newhouse Center for the Humanities at Wellesley College, she has been a Professor of English and Creative Writing at Boston College since 1993.

Graver's 2013 novel, The End of the Point, was long-listed for the 2013 National Book Award and has met with praise since its release. The novel, featured by The New York Times Book Review editor Alida Becker, is set in a summer community on the coast of Massachusetts from 1942 through 1999 and is a layered meditation on place and family across half a century. Graver's first novel, Unravelling, is set in 19th-century America in the Lowell textile mills and tells the story of a fiercely independent young woman and the life she eventually fashions for herself. Benjamin Demott, reviewing it for The New York Times, wrote that Unravelling "creates a home-on-the-margins beyond cant—a kind of exiles' utopia, intensely imagined, right-valued, memorable." The Honey Thief, a contemporary novel exploring a mother-daughter relationship, was reviewed by Katherine Weber for The New York Times.,  who described it as a narrative in which "neither resolution nor redemption is guaranteed—or even, necessarily, hoped for."

Personal life 
Married to prisoners' rights lawyer James Pingeon, Graver is the mother of two daughters.

Works

Novels
 Kantika (Metropolitan Books/Henry Holt & Co. 2023)
The End of the Point (HarperCollins 2013)
  Awake (Henry Holt & Co. 2005)
 The Honey Thief (Hyperion 2000)
 Unravelling (Hyperion 1999)

Short stories
 Have You Seen Me? (University of Pittsburgh Press 1991) Drue Heinz Literature Prize (Judge: Richard Ford).
 ”The Mourning Door” by Graver, Elizabeth.  Ploughshares, vol. 26, no. 2/3, 2000, pp. 80–89.

Anthologies (selected)
 "All Aunt Hagar's Children: Edward P. Jones, B-Sides Books: Essays on Forgotten Favorites 2021, John Plotz, ed. 
 "Two Baths": Best American Essays 1991, Cynthia Ozick, guest ed. 
 “The Mourning Door”:  ''Best American Short Stories 2001, Barbara Kingsolver, guest ed.; Prize Stories 2001: The O. Henry Awards, Mary Gordon, Michael Chabon, Mona Simpson, guest eds; Pushcart Prize XXVI: Best of the Small Presses, Bill Henderson, ed.
“Between”: Prize Stories 1996: The O. Henry Awards, William Abrahams, ed. 
“The Boy Who Fell Forty Feet”: Prize Stories 1994: The O. Henry Awards," William Abrahams, ed.
“The Body Shop”: Best American Short Stories 1991, Alice Adams, guest ed.

References

External links
 Author's Website: elizabethgraver.com
National Book Award Fiction Long List 2013
Boston Globe Review, The End of the Point
New York Times Review, The End of the Point
"Here and Now with Robin Young: NPR Interview on The End of the Point"
Judicial Review, March 2013: Discussing The Point of Elizabeth Graver's 'The End of the Point'  
 "The Leonard Lopate Show," NPR Interview, 3/5/13 
Washingtonpost.com Interview
The Book Show #1291, with Joe Donahue WAMC/NPR
New York Times Book Review: Unravelling
*New York Times Book Review: The Honey Thief
"Walker Evans, Kitchen Wall, Alabama Farmstead, 1936", Gastronomica Magazine'' 
https://artsbeat.blogs.nytimes.com/2008/11/28/stray-questions-for-elizabeth-graver/
"Physiological Form Meets Psychological Space: Elizabeth Graver's Four-Dimensional Stories," by Jacob M. Appel, Fiction Writers Review

Novelists from Massachusetts
Living people
1964 births
American women novelists
20th-century American novelists
Wesleyan University alumni
Cornell University alumni
People from Williamstown, Massachusetts
Boston College faculty
21st-century American novelists
20th-century American women writers
21st-century American women writers 
Jewish American writers
Washington University in St. Louis alumni